Rajwa Al Saif (born 28 April 1994) is a Saudi architect and fiancée to Hussein, Crown Prince of Jordan, to whom she has been engaged since 17 August 2022.

Early life and education
Al Saif was born in Riyadh, Saudi Arabia, on 28 April 1994. She is the youngest of four children born to Saudi businessman Khaled Al Saif, CEO of the privately-owned Al Saif Group, and his wife Azza Al Sudairi. The Al Saif family descends from the Subai tribe, the sheikhs of the town of Al-Attar in Sudair. 

Her mother belongs to the Al Sudairi family, the same family as the current King of Saudi Arabia's mother, Hussa bint Ahmed Al Sudairi, as well as that of his late spouse, Sultana bint Turki Al Sudairi. She is a first cousin of King Salman, the current King of Saudi Arabia, and a second cousin of Crown Prince Mohammed bin Salman.

Her father Khaled bin Musaed bin Saif bin Abdulaziz Al Saif graduated from the American University of Beirut with a degree in civil engineering and founded Al Seif Engineering Contracting, one of  the leading construction companies in Saudi Arabia along with a number of companies operating in other sectors.

Al Saif completed her secondary education in Saudi Arabia and proceeded to complete her higher education at the Syracuse University School of Architecture. She has also studied and worked in Los Angeles, earning a degree from the Fashion Institute of Design and Merchandising and working at an architecture firm nearby.

Engagement

On 17 August 2022, the Royal Hashemite Court announced on Twitter Al Saif's engagement to Hussein, Crown Prince of Jordan, eldest son of King Abdullah II and Queen Rania of Jordan. The engagement ceremony took place at the home of Al Saif's father in Riyadh. The ceremony was attended by the King and Queen of Jordan, Prince Hassan bin Talal, Prince Hashem bin Abdullah, Prince Ali bin Hussein, Prince Hashim bin Hussein, Prince Ghazi bin Muhammad, Prince Rashid bin Hassan and members of the Al Saif family.

On 31 December 2022, the Royal Hashemite Court announced that the couple's wedding will take place on 1 June 2023.

Future official roles
Upon the prospect of marriage, Al Saif will be designated the formal title of "Crown Princess of Jordan" with the style of Royal Highness. Once officially married to the crown prince, Al Saif will attend royal house activities just as her future mother-in-law, Queen Rania, did as crown princess. 

Further duties assigned to Al Saif will be the representation of the Crown Prince at events, including those held abroad, such as weddings of members of royal houses. Accordingly, she will attend activities related to social and charitable projects.

Public appearances 
Al Saif made her first official public appearance on 18 October 2022 when she visited the Royal Covenant with Crown Prince Hussein and his great-uncle Prince Hassan. On 23 January 2023, she accompanied Hussein during a visit to the Scent of Colour initiative for the blind and visually impaired, which marked their first official public engagement as a couple.

References

1994 births
Living people
Saudi Arabian people
Saudi Arabian women
Saudi Arabian designers
Syracuse University School of Architecture alumni
House of Hashim
Jordanian princesses
Jordanian royalty